A continentalized Mediterranean climate is a variant of the temperate mediterranean climate with influences of a typical continental climate. It is found inland in the Mediterranean region, far away from coasts. This climate is common in inland Spain and Turkey, where it borders a cold semi-arid climate.

Characteristics of the continental mediterranean climate include cooler summers (in comparison to the typical mediterranean climate) and greater variation in seasonal temperatures. This climate typically borders a cold semi-arid climate, which shares some of the same characteristics as the continental mediterranean climate.

Köppen climate classification
The Köppen climate classification does not show a distinction for the continental mediterranean climate. As such areas with this kind of climate are labeled as Csa mediterranean climate, or BSk cold semi-arid climate.

A good example of this is Madrid, which according to the Köppen climate classification has a transition Csa-BSk climate. Madrid features cooler summers, and greater seasonal temperature variation compared to other mediterranean climates. It is also relatively dry, a characteristic of the Meseta Central of Central Spain.

Iberia 

To better accurately depict the climate of Spain and Portugal, the Mediterranean climate is further categorized into not summer temperatures, (as per the Köppen climate classification), but by the harshness of the winter season. The "typical" Mediterranean climate is found in coastal regions (excluding the northern coast), while the continental Mediterranean climate dominates the interior of the country.

References

Climate